Minuscule 503 (in the Gregory-Aland numbering), ε 325 (in the Soden numbering), is a Greek minuscule manuscript of the New Testament, on parchment. Palaeographically it has been assigned to the 13th century.
Scrivener labelled it by number 590. The manuscript is lacunose.

Description 

The codex contains the text of the Gospel of John on 60 parchment leaves (size ). The text is written in one column per page, 25-27 lines per page.

It is also divided according to the Ammonian Sections, but there are no references to the Eusebian Canons. It has lectionary markings at the margin (for liturgical use).

Text 

The Greek text of the codex is a mixture of the text-types. Aland did not place it in any Category.

History 

The manuscript was written by Cosmas Vanaretus, a monk. Formerly it belonged to the monastery of St. Maximus. In 1853 it was bought together with Minuscule 502 from Constantine Simonides.

It was added to the list of the New testament manuscripts by F. H. A. Scrivener (590) and C. R. Gregory (503).

It was examined by Bloomfield, Scrivener, and Gregory (in 1883).

It is currently housed at the British Library (Add MS 19389) in London.

See also 

 List of New Testament minuscules
 Biblical manuscript
 Textual criticism

References

Further reading 

 

Greek New Testament minuscules
13th-century biblical manuscripts
British Library additional manuscripts